Kim So-yeong (Hangul: 김소영; born 9 July 1992) is a South Korean badminton player. Kim, who attended the University of Incheon, was the triple crowns at the 2013 Summer Universiade, by winning the gold medals in the women's doubles, mixed doubles and team event. She competed at the 2014 Asian Games, clinched the silver medal in the women's team event. Together with Kong Hee-yong, she was awarded as the 2019 BWF Most Improved Player of the Year.

Achievements

Olympic Games 
Women's doubles

World Championships 
Women's doubles

Asian Championships 
Women's doubles

Summer Universiade 
Women's doubles

Mixed doubles

BWF World Tour (8 titles, 6 runners-up) 
The BWF World Tour, which was announced on 19 March 2017 and implemented in 2018, is a series of elite badminton tournaments sanctioned by the Badminton World Federation (BWF). The BWF World Tours are divided into levels of World Tour Finals, Super 1000, Super 750, Super 500, Super 300 (part of the HSBC World Tour), and the BWF Tour Super 100.

Women's doubles

BWF Grand Prix (3 titles, 3 runners-up) 
The BWF Grand Prix had two levels, the Grand Prix and Grand Prix Gold. It was a series of badminton tournaments sanctioned by the Badminton World Federation (BWF) and played between 2007 and 2017.

Women's doubles

  BWF Grand Prix Gold tournament
  BWF Grand Prix tournament

BWF International Challenge/Series (1 title) 
Women's doubles

  BWF International Challenge tournament
  BWF International Series tournament

References

External links 

 

1992 births
Living people
Sportspeople from Daegu
South Korean female badminton players
Badminton players at the 2020 Summer Olympics
Olympic badminton players of South Korea
Olympic bronze medalists for South Korea
Olympic medalists in badminton
Medalists at the 2020 Summer Olympics
Badminton players at the 2014 Asian Games
Asian Games silver medalists for South Korea
Asian Games medalists in badminton
Medalists at the 2014 Asian Games
Universiade gold medalists for South Korea
Universiade medalists in badminton
Medalists at the 2013 Summer Universiade
21st-century South Korean women
20th-century South Korean women
World No. 1 badminton players